Civic Center Station or Civic Center Transit Center may refer to:

United States
Civic Center station (MARTA), in Atlanta, Georgia
Civic Center station (HART), in Honolulu, Hawaii
Civic Center/Grand Park station, in Los Angeles, California
Civic Center station (Metrorail), in Miami, Florida
Civic Center station (San Diego Trolley), in San Diego, California
Civic Center / UN Plaza Station, in San Francisco, California
Civic Center (VTA) in San Jose, California
Civic Center (St. Louis MetroLink), in St. Louis, Missouri

China
Civic Center station (Shenzhen Metro), in Shenzhen, Guangdong, China
Civic Center Station (Wuxi), in Wuxi, Jiangsu, China
Civic Center station (Zhengzhou Metro), in Zhengzhou, Henan, China
, in Nanchan, Jiangxi, China 

Thailand 
Nonthaburi Civic Center MRT station, in Nonthaburi, Nonthaburi Province, Thailand